Irish singer-songwriter Brian McFadden has released five studio albums and seventeen singles. He is signed to BMF Records, Universal Music Australia and Island Records Australia.

Two of his studio albums have charted within the top 10 including his debut album, Irish Son (2004), which peaked within the top 6 on the Irish and Danish albums charts and also his second, Set in Stone (2008), which peaked at No. 5 on the ARIA Australian Albums Chart. Five of his singles have also reached the top 10, including four No. 1s and has also had two other top 15 singles. His debut single "Real to Me" from the album, Irish Son became his first No. 1 single as a solo artist in four European countries. The album also produced the song "Almost Here", a duet with his fiancé Delta Goodrem, which became his second No. 1 and gained a platinum accreditation in Australia. In 2007, McFadden released "Like Only a Woman Can", which became his third consecutive Ireland number-one single. His third studio album, Wall of Soundz, was released in April 2010 and produced his fourth No. 1 single, "Just Say So", which features American rapper Kevin Rudolf and became a platinum seller in Australia.

Studio albums

Singles

As lead artist

As featured artist

Other appearances

References

Discographies of Irish artists
Pop music discographies